"Disremembrance" is a song written by David Green and Ian Masterson for Dannii Minogue's third studio album Girl (1997). The song was produced by Flexifinger and received a positive reception from music critics. It was released as the third single on 16 March 1998 and peaked at number 21 in the United Kingdom. In Australia, the song narrowly missed peaking within the top 50, reaching number 53 and spending five weeks in the top 100.

Track listings
CD single 1
 "Disremembrance" (Flexifinger's Radio Edit) – 4:05
 "Disremembrance" (Trouser Enthusiasts' Brittlestar Requiem Mix) – 12:16
 "Disremembrance" (D-Bop's Lost In Space Mix) – 8:06
 "Disremembrance" (Sharp Rocket Remix) – 8:04
 "Disremembrance" (Twice As Nyce Dub Mix) – 5:44

CD single 2
 "Disremembrance" (Flexifinger's Radio Edit) – 4:05
 "Disremembrance" (Flexifinger's Ext. "Orchestral" Mix) – 9:31
 "Disremembrance" (Xenomania 12" Mix) – 7:42
 "Disremembrance" (Xenomania "Breakbeat" Mix) – 7:42
 "Disremembrance" (Flexifinger's 12" Pop Mix) – 6:26
 "Disremembrance" music video

Cassette
 "Disremembrance" (Flexifinger's Radio Edit) – 4:02
 "Disremembrance" (Xenomania Edit) – 4:25
 "Disremembrance" (Trouser Enthusiast's Radio Edit) – 4:27

Additional remixes

The following remixes were commissioned but not released on the commercial releases of "Disremembrance".
 "Disremembrance" (Trouser Enthusiasts' Diesel Plus Plus Dub) - 9:59
 "Disremembrance" (Trouser Enthusiasts' Radio Edit) - 4:43 ( released on the cassette single, and later released on the "Girl" reissue)
 "Disremembrance" (Sharp Rocket Instrumental)
 "Disremembrance" (Twice As Nyce 1:40 AM Mix) - 6:06 (later released on the "Girl" reissue)
 "Disremembrance" (Xenomania Edit) - 4:25

Charts

References

External links
"Disremembrance" lyrics

1998 singles
Dannii Minogue songs
Songs written by Ian Masterson